Andriy Romanovych Lipovuz (born 29 January 1998) is a Ukrainian professional footballer who plays as a defensive midfielder for Ukrainian club Podillya Khmelnytskyi.

References

External links
 Profile on Podillya Khmelnytskyi official website
 

1998 births
Living people
Sportspeople from Khmelnytskyi, Ukraine
Ukrainian footballers
Association football midfielders
FC Podillya Khmelnytskyi players
Ukrainian First League players
Ukrainian Second League players